Sicherman dice  are a pair of 6-sided dice with non-standard numbers–one with the sides 1, 2, 2, 3, 3, 4 and the other with the sides 1, 3, 4, 5, 6, 8. They are notable as the  only pair of 6-sided dice that are not normal dice, bear only positive integers, and have the same probability distribution for the sum as normal dice.  They were invented in 1978 by George Sicherman of Buffalo, New York.

Mathematics
A standard exercise in elementary combinatorics is to calculate the number of ways of rolling any given value with a pair of fair six-sided dice (by taking the sum of the two rolls). The table shows the number of such ways of rolling a given value : 

Crazy dice is a mathematical exercise in elementary combinatorics, involving a re-labeling of the faces of a pair of six-sided dice to reproduce the same frequency of sums as the standard labeling. The Sicherman dice are crazy dice that are re-labeled with only positive integers. (If the integers need not be positive, to get the same probability distribution, the number on each face of one die can be decreased by k and that of the other die increased by k, for any natural number k, giving infinitely many solutions.)

The table below lists all possible totals of dice rolls with standard dice and Sicherman dice. One Sicherman die is coloured  for clarity: 1–2–2–3–3–4, and the other is all black, 1–3–4–5–6–8.

History
The Sicherman dice were discovered by George Sicherman of Buffalo, New York and were originally reported by Martin Gardner in a 1978 article in Scientific American.

The numbers can be arranged so that all pairs of numbers on opposing sides sum to equal numbers, 5 for the first and 9 for the second.

Later, in a letter to Sicherman, Gardner mentioned that a magician he knew had anticipated Sicherman's discovery. For generalizations of the Sicherman dice to more than two dice and noncubical dice, see Broline (1979), Gallian and Rusin (1979), Brunson and Swift (1997/1998), and Fowler and Swift (1999).

Mathematical justification
Let a canonical n-sided die be an n-hedron whose faces are marked with the integers [1,n] such that the probability of throwing each number is 1/n. Consider the canonical cubical (six-sided) die. The product of this polynomial with itself yields the generating function for the throws of a pair of dice: . From the theory of cyclotomic polynomials, we know that

.
We therefore derive the generating function of a single n-sided canonical die as being

 and is canceled. Thus the factorization of the generating function of a six-sided canonical die is

The generating function for the throws of two dice is the product of two copies of each of these factors. How can we partition them to form two legal dice whose spots are not arranged traditionally? Here legal means that the coefficients are non-negative and sum to six, so that each die has six sides and every face has at least one spot.  (That is, the generating function of each die must be a polynomial p(x) with positive coefficients, and with p(0) = 0 and p(1) = 6.)  
Only one such partition exists:

and

This gives us the distribution of spots on the faces of a pair of Sicherman dice as being {1,2,2,3,3,4} and {1,3,4,5,6,8}, as above.

This technique can be extended for dice with an arbitrary number of sides.

References

See also 
 Two-cube calendar

External links 
Mathworld's Information Page

Dice
Combinatorics